Adam Bowen (born 1974/1975) is an American businessman, and the co-founder (with James Monsees) and currently advisor at Juul Labs, an electronic cigarette company.

Bowen earned a BA in physics from Pomona College, followed by an MS in product design from Stanford University.

In December 2018, following Altria taking a 35% stake in Juul, Bowen's net worth increased from an estimated $730 million to more than $1.1 billion. After subsequent write-downs of the value of Juul, Forbes no longer considers Bowen a billionaire as of 2020.

Bowen is married, with three children, and lives in San Mateo, California.

References

Living people
Pomona College alumni
Stanford University alumni
Year of birth missing (living people)
1970s births
People from San Mateo, California
American company founders

Former billionaires
21st-century American businesspeople